Lobelia rhytidosperma, commonly known as wrinkled-seeded lobelia, is a small herbaceous plant in the family Campanulaceae native to Western Australia.

It  blooms between October and December producing blue flowers.

The species is found along the west coast in the South West, Wheatbelt and Mid West regions of Western Australia where it grows in lateritic soils.

References

rhytidosperma
Flora of Western Australia
Plants described in 1868